Thorstein John Ohnstad Fretheim (10 May 1886 – 29 June 1971) was a Norwegian acting councillor of state in the NS government of Vidkun Quisling 1940–1941, and minister 1941–1945. Fretheim was a district veterinary by profession. In the post-war legal purges he was convicted of treason and sentenced to 20 years of forced labour, being pardoned in 1951.

References

1886 births
1971 deaths
Ministers of Agriculture and Food of Norway
Members of Nasjonal Samling
People convicted of treason for Nazi Germany against Norway